Right On is the nineteenth studio album by The Supremes, released in 1970 for the Motown label. It was the group's first album not to feature former lead singer Diana Ross. Her replacement, Jean Terrell, began recording Right On with Mary Wilson and Cindy Birdsong in mid-1969, while Wilson and Birdsong were still touring with Ross.

Frank Wilson, a former protégé of Motown producer Norman Whitfield, produced much of Right On, working to establish the "New Supremes" (as Motown began marketing the new Terrell-led lineup) as a group unique from the Ross-led Supremes. Right On features two top 40 singles, "Up the Ladder to the Roof" (#10 Billboard and charting higher than former Supreme Ross' debut solo single a few months later) and "Everybody's Got the Right to Love". Other notable tracks include "Bill, When Are You Coming Back", an anti-Vietnam War song, and "The Loving Country", written by Ivy Jo Hunter and Smokey Robinson. A critical and commercial success, Right On reached #25 on the Billboard Top 200 albums chart, a peak 21 positions higher than the final Diana Ross-led album, Farewell.

Track listing
"Up the Ladder to the Roof" (Frank Wilson, Vincent DiMirco)
"Then We Can Try Again" (Clarence McMurray, J. Dean)
"Everybody's Got the Right to Love" (Lou Stallman)
"Wait a Minute Before You Leave Me" (N. Toney, W. Garrett, A. Hamilton)
"You Move Me" (W. Garrett, A. Hamilton)
"But I Love You More" (Frank Wilson, Sherlie Matthews)
"I Got Hurt (Trying to Be the Only Girl in Your Life)" (Clarence McMurray, J. Dean, J. Glover)
"Baby Baby" (H. Lewis, K. Lewis)
"Take a Closer Look at Me" (Henry Cosby, Pam Sawyer, Joe Hinton)
"Then I Met You" (J. Roach)
"Bill, When Are You Coming Back" (Pam Sawyer, Johnny Bristol)
"The Loving Country" (Smokey Robinson, Ivy Jo Hunter)

Covers
On the album The Supremes covered "Baby Baby" by The Miracles. "But I Love You More" was also recorded by The Blackberries.

Unused recordings from the Right On sessions
During this period, the Supremes were constantly in the studio recording a wide variety of tracks; many of which currently remain unreleased. 
"The Day Will Come Between Sunday and Monday"  (eventually released on the Supremes box set)
"Life Beats"  (eventually released on The '70s Anthology)
"Steppin' on a Dream"
"That's How Much You Made Me Love You"
"You Only Miss Me When You See Me"
"Loneliness Is a Lonely Feeling"
"Send Him to Me" (Mary Wilson lead vocal)
"If You Let Me Baby" (Mary Wilson lead vocal)
"Mind, Body and Soul"
"How Long Has That Evening Train Been Gone"
"Can't You Hear Me Knocking"
"I Want to Go Back There Again"
"You've Got to Pay the Price"

Personnel
The Supremes
Jean Terrell - lead vocals
Mary Wilson, Cindy Birdsong, The Andantes, & The Blackberries - background vocals

Technical
Frank Wilson - producer
Curtis McNair - art direction
Frank Dandridge - photography

Charts

Weekly charts

Year-end charts

References

1970 albums
The Supremes albums
Albums produced by Frank Wilson (musician)
Albums produced by Ivy Jo Hunter
Motown albums